Hall School in Hall, Indiana, was designed by Henry H. Dupont and built in 1911. It is located at 5955 West Hurt Road at Hall in Gregg Township.  It is an example of the Craftsman architecture in the vernacular. The building has 2-floors with six classrooms and additions built in 1957 and 1971. The Morgan County Historic Preservation Society, an affiliate of Indiana Landmarks, nominated the school to the National Register of Historic Places in 2004, a year before the building went vacant due to school consolidation.

It was listed on the National Register of Historic Places in 2004.

References

School buildings on the National Register of Historic Places in Indiana
Bungalow architecture in Indiana
School buildings completed in 1911
Buildings and structures in Morgan County, Indiana
National Register of Historic Places in Morgan County, Indiana
1911 establishments in Indiana